The Taifa of Jerez was a medieval Islamic taifa Moorish kingdom in what is now southern Spain. Established in 1145, it existed until it was conquered by the Almohad Caliphate.

Jerez remained under Muslim rule until 1261. Following the collapse of the Almohad Caliphate, it emerged as an independent enclave until conquered by Castile. It was ruled by Arabs of the Banu Khazraj tribe.

List of Emirs
  Abu'l-Qaim Ahyal: 1145
  Abu'l-Gammar: 1145
 'Ali: 1145
 To the Almohads

1145 disestablishments
States and territories established in 1145
Jerez
Jerez de la Frontera
History of Andalusia